Christopher Rajendran Hyman CBE (born 5 July 1963) is a South African businessman. He was chief executive (CEO) of Serco Group from 2002 to October 2013.

Career
On graduation, he worked for Arthur Andersen. In 1989, he won an 18-month exchange with Ernst & Young in London, who employed him after four months. headhunted in 1994 by Serco, Hyman became European finance director, and in 1999 was made group finance director. In 2002, Hyman became chief executive.

Hyman was appointed Commander of the Order of the British Empire (CBE) in the 2010 Birthday Honours for services to business and charity.

Hyman resigned from his role of CEO of Serco in October 2013 following allegations that Serco had overcharged government customers.

Racing driver
Hyman is a motor racing fan and has competed in the Formula Palmer Audi series and the FIA GT3 European Championship.

Personal life
Married to fellow South African Lianne, the couple have two children. His son Raoul is also a racing driver. He was on the 47th floor of the World Trade Center at the time of the September 11 attacks in 2001.

References

External links
Official racing driver website
Interview with Management Today

1963 births
Living people
People from Durban
South African people of Indian descent
South African Pentecostals
University of Natal alumni
South African businesspeople
Serco people
South African chief executives
South African racing drivers
British GT Championship drivers
Commanders of the Order of the British Empire
ADAC GT Masters drivers